Shouldice is a hamlet in southern Alberta, Canada within Vulcan County.

Demographics 
The population of Shouldice according to the 2007 municipal census conducted by Vulcan County is 7.

See also 
List of communities in Alberta
List of hamlets in Alberta

References 

Hamlets in Alberta
Vulcan County